Wayne County High School may refer to any of the following United States educational institutions:

Wayne County High School (Georgia) in Jesup, Georgia
Wayne County High School (Kentucky) in Monticello, Kentucky
Wayne County High School (Mississippi) in Waynesboro, Mississippi
Wayne County High School (Tennessee) in Waynesboro, Tennessee
Wayne County High School (Utah) in Bicknell, Utah

See also
 Wayne High School (disambiguation)